The 1979–80 Pittsburgh Penguins season was their 13th in the National Hockey League.

Regular season
The Penguins changed their team colors from two-tone blue to Black and Gold in January. This move was done in part to honor the other two professional teams in Pittsburgh (the Steelers and Pirates) both of whom won their respective championships in 1979. The Boston Bruins initially challenged the change in colors as the new scheme closely matched their own. However, as the original NHL franchise in Pittsburgh, the Pirates, had nearly the same colors from their inception while the Bruins wore brown and yellow sweaters NHL president John Ziegler Jr. eventually denied the Bruins claim. The new Pittsburgh jerseys were debuted on January 30 against the visiting St. Louis Blues.

Division standings

Schedule and results

|- style="background:#cfc;"
| 1 || Oct 10 || Winnipeg Jets || 2–4 || Pittsburgh Penguins || Civic Arena (8,752) || 1–0–0 || 2
|- style="background:#ffc;"
| 2 || Oct 13 || Hartford Whalers || 3–3 || Pittsburgh Penguins || Civic Arena (8,623) || 1–0–1 || 3
|- style="background:#cfc;"
| 3 || Oct 14 || Pittsburgh Penguins || 4–1 || Boston Bruins || Boston Garden (9,494) || 2–0–1 || 5
|- style="background:#fcf;"
| 4 || Oct 17 || Los Angeles Kings || 5–4 || Pittsburgh Penguins || Civic Arena (4,815) || 2–1–1 || 5
|- style="background:#cfc;"
| 5 || Oct 20 || Washington Capitals || 1–5 || Pittsburgh Penguins || Civic Arena (7,629) || 3–1–1 || 7
|- style="background:#fcf;"
| 6 || Oct 21 || Pittsburgh Penguins || 3–6 || New York Rangers || Madison Square Garden (IV) (17,425) || 3–2–1 || 7
|- style="background:#fcf;"
| 7 || Oct 24 || Pittsburgh Penguins || 3–7 || Buffalo Sabres || Buffalo Memorial Auditorium (16,433) || 3–3–1 || 7
|- style="background:#fcf;"
| 8 || Oct 25 || Pittsburgh Penguins || 5–8 || Montreal Canadiens || Montreal Forum (15,969) || 3–4–1 || 7
|- style="background:#cfc;"
| 9 || Oct 31 || Colorado Rockies || 2–4 || Pittsburgh Penguins || Civic Arena (4,173) || 4–4–1 || 9
|-

|- style="background:#ffc;"
| 10 || Nov 3 || Atlanta Flames || 3–3 || Pittsburgh Penguins || Civic Arena (8,543) || 4–4–2 || 10
|- style="background:#ffc;"
| 11 || Nov 7 || Montreal Canadiens || 3–3 || Pittsburgh Penguins || Civic Arena (9,064) || 4–4–3 || 11
|- style="background:#fcf;"
| 12 || Nov 10 || Boston Bruins || 6–1 || Pittsburgh Penguins || Civic Arena (12,208) || 4–5–3 || 11
|- style="background:#cfc;"
| 13 || Nov 11 || Pittsburgh Penguins || 4–1 || New York Rangers || Madison Square Garden (IV) (17,419) || 5–5–3 || 13
|- style="background:#ffc;"
| 14 || Nov 15 || Pittsburgh Penguins || 3–3 || Los Angeles Kings || The Forum (7,698) || 5–5–4 || 14
|- style="background:#fcf;"
| 15 || Nov 16 || Pittsburgh Penguins || 2–5 || Vancouver Canucks || Pacific Coliseum (15,127) || 5–6–4 || 14
|- style="background:#cfc;"
| 16 || Nov 18 || Pittsburgh Penguins || 3–2 || Winnipeg Jets || Winnipeg Arena (12,668) || 6–6–4 || 16
|- style="background:#cfc;"
| 17 || Nov 21 || St. Louis Blues || 2–5 || Pittsburgh Penguins || Civic Arena (11,547) || 7–6–4 || 18
|- style="background:#fcf;"
| 18 || Nov 23 || Pittsburgh Penguins || 1–4 || Atlanta Flames || Omni Coliseum (13,081) || 7–7–4 || 18
|- style="background:#cfc;"
| 19 || Nov 24 || New York Rangers || 3–5 || Pittsburgh Penguins || Civic Arena (11,629) || 8–7–4 || 20
|- style="background:#cfc;"
| 20 || Nov 28 || Quebec Nordiques || 2–7 || Pittsburgh Penguins || Civic Arena (8,396) || 9–7–4 || 22
|- style="background:#fcf;"
| 21 || Nov 30 || Pittsburgh Penguins || 5–7 || Hartford Whalers || Springfield Civic Center (7,627) || 9–8–4 || 22
|-

|- style="background:#cfc;"
| 22 || Dec 1 || Colorado Rockies || 4–5 || Pittsburgh Penguins || Civic Arena (12,051) || 10–8–4 || 24
|- style="background:#ffc;"
| 23 || Dec 5 || Vancouver Canucks || 3–3 || Pittsburgh Penguins || Civic Arena (7,511) || 10–8–5 || 25
|- style="background:#cfc;"
| 24 || Dec 7 || Pittsburgh Penguins || 5–3 || Washington Capitals || Capital Centre (7,652) || 11–8–5 || 27
|- style="background:#ffc;"
| 25 || Dec 8 || Chicago Black Hawks || 3–3 || Pittsburgh Penguins || Civic Arena (10,284) || 11–8–6 || 28
|- style="background:#ffc;"
| 26 || Dec 11 || Pittsburgh Penguins || 3–3 || St. Louis Blues || The Checkerdome (8,605) || 11–8–7 || 29
|- style="background:#ffc;"
| 27 || Dec 12 || New York Islanders || 3–3 || Pittsburgh Penguins || Civic Arena (8,036) || 11–8–8 || 30
|- style="background:#ffc;"
| 28 || Dec 15 || Pittsburgh Penguins || 3–3 || New York Islanders || Nassau Veterans Memorial Coliseum (14,995) || 11–8–9 || 31
|- style="background:#fcf;"
| 29 || Dec 16 || Pittsburgh Penguins || 1–4 || Quebec Nordiques || Quebec Coliseum (10,279) || 11–9–9 || 31
|- style="background:#ffc;"
| 30 || Dec 19 || Pittsburgh Penguins || 0–0 || Chicago Black Hawks || Chicago Stadium (8,215) || 11–9–10 || 32
|- style="background:#ffc;"
| 31 || Dec 20 || Pittsburgh Penguins || 1–1 || Philadelphia Flyers || The Spectrum (17,077) || 11–9–11 || 33
|- style="background:#fcf;"
| 32 || Dec 22 || New York Rangers || 4–3 || Pittsburgh Penguins || Civic Arena (11,587) || 11–10–11 || 33
|- style="background:#cfc;"
| 33 || Dec 26 || Detroit Red Wings || 4–6 || Pittsburgh Penguins || Civic Arena (11,243) || 12–10–11 || 35
|- style="background:#cfc;"
| 34 || Dec 28 || Pittsburgh Penguins || 4–2 || Atlanta Flames || Omni Coliseum (9,133) || 13–10–11 || 37
|- style="background:#cfc;"
| 35 || Dec 29 || Atlanta Flames || 2–3 || Pittsburgh Penguins || Civic Arena (10,416) || 14–10–11 || 39
|- style="background:#fcf;"
| 36 || Dec 31 || Pittsburgh Penguins || 2–4 || Minnesota North Stars || Met Center (11,475) || 14–11–11 || 39
|-

|- style="background:#cfc;"
| 37 || Jan 2 || Montreal Canadiens || 3–5 || Pittsburgh Penguins || Civic Arena (13,309) || 15–11–11 || 41
|- style="background:#cfc;"
| 38 || Jan 3 || Pittsburgh Penguins || 4–3 || New York Islanders || Nassau Veterans Memorial Coliseum (14,580) || 16–11–11 || 43
|- style="background:#fcf;"
| 39 || Jan 5 || Buffalo Sabres || 5–4 || Pittsburgh Penguins || Civic Arena (15,583) || 16–12–11 || 43
|- style="background:#fcf;"
| 40 || Jan 7 || Pittsburgh Penguins || 5–9 || Toronto Maple Leafs || Maple Leaf Gardens (16,485) || 16–13–11 || 43
|- style="background:#cfc;"
| 41 || Jan 9 || Vancouver Canucks || 2–4 || Pittsburgh Penguins || Civic Arena (8,784) || 17–13–11 || 45
|- style="background:#fcf;"
| 42 || Jan 12 || Chicago Black Hawks || 3–2 || Pittsburgh Penguins || Civic Arena (13,825) || 17–14–11 || 45
|- style="background:#cfc;"
| 43 || Jan 16 || Toronto Maple Leafs || 4–6 || Pittsburgh Penguins || Civic Arena (9,002) || 18–14–11 || 47
|- style="background:#fcf;"
| 44 || Jan 17 || Pittsburgh Penguins || 1–7 || Hartford Whalers || Springfield Civic Center (7,627) || 18–15–11 || 47
|- style="background:#fcf;"
| 45 || Jan 19 || Edmonton Oilers || 5–2 || Pittsburgh Penguins || Civic Arena (12,896) || 18–16–11 || 47
|- style="background:#fcf;"
| 46 || Jan 23 || Pittsburgh Penguins || 3–4 || Edmonton Oilers || Northlands Coliseum (15,423) || 18–17–11 || 47
|- style="background:#fcf;"
| 47 || Jan 24 || Pittsburgh Penguins || 1–4 || Colorado Rockies || McNichols Sports Arena (7,615) || 18–18–11 || 47
|- style="background:#fcf;"
| 48 || Jan 26 || Boston Bruins || 6–4 || Pittsburgh Penguins || Civic Arena (16,033) || 18–19–11 || 47
|- style="background:#cfc;"
| 49 || Jan 27 || Pittsburgh Penguins || 5–3 || Boston Bruins || Boston Garden (13,131) || 19–19–11 || 49
|- style="background:#fcf;"
| 50 || Jan 30 || St. Louis Blues || 4–3 || Pittsburgh Penguins || Civic Arena (12,345) || 19–20–11 || 49
|- style="background:#fcf;"
| 51 || Jan 31 || Pittsburgh Penguins || 3–4 || Detroit Red Wings || Joe Louis Arena (14,432) || 19–21–11 || 49
|-

|- style="background:#fcf;"
| 52 || Feb 2 || Philadelphia Flyers || 4–0 || Pittsburgh Penguins || Civic Arena (16,033) || 19–22–11 || 49
|- style="background:#fcf;"
| 53 || Feb 7 || Pittsburgh Penguins || 0–9 || Buffalo Sabres || Buffalo Memorial Auditorium (16,433) || 19–23–11 || 49
|- style="background:#fcf;"
| 54 || Feb 9 || Minnesota North Stars || 5–2 || Pittsburgh Penguins || Civic Arena (13,011) || 19–24–11 || 49
|- style="background:#fcf;"
| 55 || Feb 10 || Pittsburgh Penguins || 2–3 || Chicago Black Hawks || Chicago Stadium (12,272) || 19–25–11 || 49
|- style="background:#cfc;"
| 56 || Feb 13 || Pittsburgh Penguins || 4–2 || Toronto Maple Leafs || Maple Leaf Gardens (16,485) || 20–25–11 || 51
|- style="background:#fcf;"
| 57 || Feb 16 || Pittsburgh Penguins || 1–8 || Montreal Canadiens || Montreal Forum (17,075) || 20–26–11 || 51
|- style="background:#fcf;"
| 58 || Feb 17 || Pittsburgh Penguins || 5–6 || Philadelphia Flyers || The Spectrum (17,077) || 20–27–11 || 51
|- style="background:#cfc;"
| 59 || Feb 20 || Detroit Red Wings || 5–7 || Pittsburgh Penguins || Civic Arena (8,077) || 21–27–11 || 53
|- style="background:#cfc;"
| 60 || Feb 23 || Quebec Nordiques || 1–2 || Pittsburgh Penguins || Civic Arena (14,116) || 22–27–11 || 55
|- style="background:#fcf;"
| 61 || Feb 24 || Pittsburgh Penguins || 0–2 || Quebec Nordiques || Quebec Coliseum (10,227) || 22–28–11 || 55
|- style="background:#cfc;"
| 62 || Feb 27 || Winnipeg Jets || 2–3 || Pittsburgh Penguins || Civic Arena (8,977) || 23–28–11 || 57
|-

|- style="background:#ffc;"
| 63 || Mar 2 || New York Islanders || 0–0 || Pittsburgh Penguins || Civic Arena (14,879) || 23–28–12 || 58
|- style="background:#fcf;"
| 64 || Mar 3 || Pittsburgh Penguins || 1–5 || St. Louis Blues || The Checkerdome (12,752) || 23–29–12 || 58
|- style="background:#fcf;"
| 65 || Mar 5 || Toronto Maple Leafs || 5–3 || Pittsburgh Penguins || Civic Arena (8,925) || 23–30–12 || 58
|- style="background:#cfc;"
| 66 || Mar 8 || Edmonton Oilers || 4–5 || Pittsburgh Penguins || Civic Arena (10,660) || 24–30–12 || 60
|- style="background:#fcf;"
| 67 || Mar 9 || Pittsburgh Penguins || 2–6 || Detroit Red Wings || Joe Louis Arena (12,819) || 24–31–12 || 60
|- style="background:#fcf;"
| 68 || Mar 11 || Philadelphia Flyers || 4–3 || Pittsburgh Penguins || Civic Arena (9,972) || 24–32–12 || 60
|- style="background:#cfc;"
| 69 || Mar 12 || Los Angeles Kings || 2–4 || Pittsburgh Penguins || Civic Arena (9,294) || 25–32–12 || 62
|- style="background:#cfc;"
| 70 || Mar 15 || Minnesota North Stars || 2–5 || Pittsburgh Penguins || Civic Arena (10,426) || 26–32–12 || 64
|- style="background:#fcf;"
| 71 || Mar 18 || Pittsburgh Penguins || 3–4 || Minnesota North Stars || Met Center (10,797) || 26–33–12 || 64
|- style="background:#fcf;"
| 72 || Mar 21 || Pittsburgh Penguins || 2–9 || Edmonton Oilers || Northlands Coliseum (15,423) || 26–34–12 || 64
|- style="background:#cfc;"
| 73 || Mar 23 || Pittsburgh Penguins || 4–2 || Winnipeg Jets || Winnipeg Arena (12,377) || 27–34–12 || 66
|- style="background:#cfc;"
| 74 || Mar 25 || Pittsburgh Penguins || 4–2 || Vancouver Canucks || Pacific Coliseum (12,998) || 28–34–12 || 68
|- style="background:#ffc;"
| 75 || Mar 27 || Pittsburgh Penguins || 2–2 || Los Angeles Kings || The Forum (9,781) || 28–34–13 || 69
|- style="background:#fcf;"
| 76 || Mar 28 || Pittsburgh Penguins || 0–5 || Colorado Rockies || McNichols Sports Arena (11,610) || 28–35–13 || 69
|- style="background:#cfc;"
| 77 || Mar 30 || Washington Capitals || 0–4 || Pittsburgh Penguins || Civic Arena (9,638) || 29–35–13 || 71
|-

|- style="background:#fcf;"
| 78 || Apr 1 || Pittsburgh Penguins || 2–6 || Washington Capitals || Capital Centre (15,821) || 29–36–13 || 71
|- style="background:#cfc;"
| 79 || Apr 2 || Hartford Whalers || 4–6 || Pittsburgh Penguins || Civic Arena (11,491) || 30–36–13 || 73
|- style="background:#fcf;"
| 80 || Apr 5 || Buffalo Sabres || 9–1 || Pittsburgh Penguins || Civic Arena (12,397) || 30–37–13 || 73
|-

|- style="text-align:center;"
| Legend:       = Win       = Loss       = Tie

Playoffs

Preliminary round vs. Boston

Player statistics
Skaters

Goaltenders

†Denotes player spent time with another team before joining the Penguins.  Stats reflect time with the Penguins only.
‡Denotes player was traded mid-season.  Stats reflect time with the Penguins only.

Transactions

The Penguins were involved in the following transactions during the 1979–80 season:

Trades

Additions and subtractions

Draft picks 

The 1979 NHL Entry Draft was held on August 9, 1979, in Montreal, Quebec.

References
 Penguins on Hockey Database

Pittsburgh Penguins seasons
Pittsburgh
Pittsburgh
Pittsburgh Penguins
Pittsburgh Penguins